The Boeing Bird of Prey was a black project aircraft, intended to demonstrate stealth technology.  It was developed by McDonnell Douglas and Boeing in the 1990s.  The company provided $67 million of funding for the project; it was a low-cost program compared to many other programs of similar scale.  It developed technology and materials which would later be used on Boeing's X-45 unmanned combat air vehicle. As an internal project, this aircraft was not given an X-plane designation.  There are no public plans to make this a production aircraft. It is characterized as a technology demonstrator.

Design and development

Development of the Bird of Prey began in 1992 by McDonnell Douglas's Phantom Works division for special projects, at Area 51. The aircraft's name is a reference to the Klingon Bird of Prey warship from the Star Trek television series. Phantom Works later became part of Boeing Integrated Defense Systems after the Boeing–McDonnell Douglas merger in 1997.

The first flight was in 1996, and 39 more flights were performed through the program's conclusion in 1999. The Bird of Prey was designed to prevent shadows and is believed to have been used to test active camouflage, which would involve its surfaces changing color or luminosity to match the surroundings.

Because it was a demonstration aircraft, the Bird of Prey used a commercial off-the-shelf turbofan engine and manual hydraulic controls rather than fly-by-wire. This shortened the development time and greatly reduced its cost. (A production aircraft would have computerized controls.)

The shape is aerodynamically stable enough to be flown without computer correction. Its aerodynamic stability is in part due to lift provided by the chines, as used in other aircraft including the SR-71 Blackbird.  This provided lift for the nose in flight. This configuration, which can be stable without a horizontal tailplane and a conventional vertical rudder, is now a standard in later stealth unmanned aerial vehicles such as the X-45 and X-47, tailless aircraft which use drag rudders (asymmetrically-used wingtip airbrakes) for yaw control.

The aircraft, which had given the designation "YF-118G" as a cover, was made public on October 18, 2002.

Aircraft on display
The Bird of Prey was put on display at the National Museum of the United States Air Force at Wright-Patterson Air Force Base near Dayton, Ohio on July 16, 2003. It is now on display at the Museum's Modern Flight Gallery above their F-22 Raptor.

Specifications

See also

References 

 Jackson, Paul. Jane's All The World's Aircraft 2003–2004. Coulsdon, UK: Jane's Information Group, 2003. .

External links 
 Bird of Prey page on GlobalSecurity.org
 YF-118G Bird Of Prey: The ‘Stealth Fighter’ Lost To History, 1945.

Stealth aircraft
1990s United States experimental aircraft
Tailless aircraft
1990s United States military aircraft
Aircraft first flown in 1996
Bird of Prey